Bloom County Babylon:  Five Years of Basic Naughtiness is the fourth collection of the comic strip series Bloom County by Berkeley Breathed.  It was published in 1986.

It is preceded by Penguin Dreams and Stranger Things and followed by Billy and the Boingers Bootleg.

As a large-format anthology, about half of the book consists of abbreviated storylines from previous collections (Loose Tails, Toons For Our Times, and Penguin Dreams and Stranger Things), as well as some strips from Bloom County'''s first year that do not appear in any other collection. The second half of the book contains a year's worth of strips that are not available in any smaller collection.  Only these new strips are summarized below.

In addition to the strips, Bloom County Babylon'' also features a short illustrated prose story, "The Great LaRouche Toad-Frog Massacre."

Synopses of major story lines

 Oliver gets a Banana Junior personal computer for Christmas.  (p115, 9 strips)
 Dubbed the "Olive Loaf Vigilante", Opus is jailed for pummeling street mimes. (p124, 16 strips)
 Spring comes to Bloom County, and after some romantic desperation, Opus gets a date.  Unfortunately, his intended runs off to marry a wrestler, and Opus must instead take out her roommate, Alf Mushpie, who hates all men, considers "romantic love" to be "a male tool for emotional domination", and reads Our Bodies, Ourselves at the dinner table.  The date concludes with Mushpie macing Steve Dallas. (p133, 20 strips)
 Oliver invents an "electro-photo-pigment-izer" capable of turning its target from Caucasian to black, with the intent of using it on the South African ambassador to the US and thereby striking a blow against apartheid.  Cutter John is entrusted with the mission of flying to Washington DC in a "shuttle chair" supported by helium balloons.  Due to a launch mishap, Opus accidentally comes along for the ride.  Cutter John and Opus discover they are above the Atlantic Ocean, 1200 miles off course, when ground control loses contact with them.  They are presumed eaten by mollusks.  (p144, 26 strips)
 A wake is held for Opus, and his will is read.  His life savings are bequeathed to Bill the Cat.  (p154, 12 strips)
 Milo removes the newly wealthy Bill the Cat from the Betty Ford Center.  In an attempt to exploit Bill's rehabilitation, Steve Dallas takes Bill on the David Letterman show, where he is expected to perform a stupid pet trick.  Bill embraces Republicanism, and starts dating Jeane Kirkpatrick.  She sends him a box of chocolates shaped like Nicaragua, with the note, "For my Bill. Let's devour it together."  (p159, 21 strips)
 Opus stumbles back to Bloom County with amnesia, remembering nothing of himself or his friends.  (p167, 19 strips)
 Oliver hacks into the Pravda computer system, and attempts to change the next day's headline to "Gorbachev urges disarmament:  Total!  Unilateral!"  Unfortunately, he mistranslates, and the headline reads "Gorbachev sings tractors:  Turnips!  Buttocks!"  (p175, 4 strips)
 Steve Dallas and Bill the Cat are held hostage by a cab driver.  (p176, 8 strips)
 Oliver predicts that Halley's comet will strike the earth in six months, annihilating all human life.  (p184, 8 strips)
 Steve Dallas receives a visit from his mother.  (p187, 9 strips)
 Opus is promoted to the Bloom Beacon's "Lifestyles" desk.  (p192, 4 strips)
 Opus visits the "Joan Collins Paint and Bodywork Clinic" for a nose job.  Opus's new petite nose is rejected by readers via a telephone poll, and his old nose is replaced against his will.  (p194, 11 strips)
 After fourteen failed marriage proposals, Steve Dallas considers an Asian mail-order bride.  The "meadow morals squad" responds with disapproval.  (p198, 7 strips)
 Oliver's Banana Junior computer is deemed obsolete, but refuses to go gently.  Oliver takes it out for one last hack.  (p201, 3 strips)
 It is discovered that Bill the Cat is a Communist spy, and was taking advantage of Jeane Kirkpatrick in order to sell secrets to the Soviets.  He is arrested and imprisoned, along with his suspected accomplice Opus.  During a press conference, a vigilante shoots off Opus's nose, and Opus must briefly live off of a "mechanical honker".  At Bill's trial, his attorney Steve Dallas plea bargains him into the electric chair.  (p204, 30 strips)
 Opus is shocked out of his amnesia upon hearing that Diane Sawyer married Eddie Murphy, and is now able to recall his adventure with Cutter John.  The "shuttle chair" had made an emergency landing in the Atlantic, but despite a full supply of canned provisions, Opus had forgotten the can opener.  The two spent weeks adrift, occasionally coming across uninhabitable islands such as "The Island of People Who Realize that Miami Vice Is Garbage", "The Land of Radical Feminists Who Secretly Dig Beefcake", and "The Forgotten Island of Effeminate Pop Stars".  Finally, they were captured as suspected spies by a Soviet submarine, although Opus was released for being a nuisance.  (p216, 16 strips)

References

Bloom County
Books by Berkeley Breathed
Little, Brown and Company books
1986 books